Ronda E. Stryker (born 1954) is an American billionaire heiress, a granddaughter of Homer Stryker, the founder of medical equipment manufacturer Stryker Corporation, of which she is a director.

Early life
Ronda Stryker was born in 1954, the daughter of Lee Stryker and his first wife Betty Stryker. Lee and his second wife Nancy died when he crashed his plane in Wyoming in 1976. She has two siblings, Patricia and Jon. She has a bachelor's degree from University of Northern Colorado, and a master's from  Western Michigan University.

Career
She has been a director of Stryker Corporation for nearly 30 years, as of 2018.

Personal life
She is married to William Johnston, the chairman of Greenleaf Trust, an investment management company that owns shares in Stryker Corporation. They have three children, and live in Portage, Michigan.

Stryker is a member of the Harvard Medical School board of fellows.

References

1954 births
Living people
American billionaires
Female billionaires
Harvard Medical School people
People from Portage, Michigan
Stryker family
University of Northern Colorado alumni
Western Michigan University alumni